Nesta Marlee Cooper (born December 11, 1993) is a Canadian actress best known for her roles of Dani Barnes in Reality High and Shannon in The Edge of Seventeen. From 2016 to 2018 Cooper had a main role as Carly Shannon in the series Travelers. From 2019 to 2022, she played the main role of Haniwa on the Apple TV+ original program, See.

Early life and education
At the age of seven, Cooper moved to Courtenay, British Columbia, with her parents. She pursued a career in the arts whenever the opportunity presented itself. After she completed high school, she moved to Vancouver for more film opportunities.

Career
Cooper’s first television role was in 2013, appearing in two episodes of the series Cult. Her first film role was in the 2015 movie Diablo. 

In early 2015, Cooper started working as a production assistant on a short film showcasing Truvelle's eight-piece 2015 bridal collection. On May 12, 2015, the film was released on Vimeo.

Cooper played Carly Shannon (Traveler 3465) on the science fiction series Travelers (2016–2018), about special operatives tasked with preventing the collapse of society. These operatives, known as "travelers", have their consciousnesses sent back in time and transferred into the "host" body of present-day individuals who are about to die, minimizing unexpected impact on the future. As Carly, the team's tactician, she assumes the life of a stay-at-home single mother.

Cooper played a main character in Apple TV+'s See (2019–2022), about a post-apocalyptic world where most of humanity is blind. As Haniwa, Cooper played one of two sighted children of Baba Voss and Maghra (her character is the biological daughter of Jerlmarel, who was also sighted). Proud, determined, and strong, Haniwa grows to be more rebellious than her twin brother Kofun, and more curious about the children's true origins.

Personal life
Cooper began dating Peter Van Auker (brother of Adam Merrill Van Auker), an associate producer on Reality High, after the film had completely wrapped on November 21, 2016.

Filmography

Film

Television

References

External links
 
 

1993 births
Living people
Actresses from Ontario
Canadian film actresses
Canadian television actresses
People from Mississauga
21st-century Canadian actresses
Black Canadian actresses
Canadian people of African-American descent